Stone Cage  or Stone Grief  is an Armenian comedy drama television series developed by Vache Tovmasyan. The series premiered on ATV on December 8, 2015.
The series was filmed in Yerevan, Armenia.

Premise
A young genius scientist invents a time machine and plans to test it before the Scientific Committee. But his idle and debt-ridden friend, found in the laboratory under certain circumstances, activates the time machine which takes him to the Stone Age where he has to live with a wild tribe because of the faulty machine. And it all starts here. Stone Age turns into a real Stone Agony!

Series overview

Cast and characters

 Vache Tovmasyan as Moso
 Anati Saqanyan as Sisianush
 Rafayel Yeranosyan as Babal
 Rudolph Ghevondyan as Hovsep
 Armush as Gogo (season 1–2)
 Anna Manucharyan as Nini
 Diana Muradyan as Lolo (season 1–2)
 Hakob Hakobyan as Mamouk (season 1)
 Levon Varpetyan as Koko (season 1–2)
 Arman Hovhannisyan as Didi (season 1)
 Alina Martirosyan as Vivi (season 2–4)
 Arame Gevorgyan as Hihi (season 2–4)
 Emil Galstyan as Soso (season 2–4)

References

External links
 
 Stone Grief on ATV
 Stone Cage season 2 (Qare Dard 2) on Armserial.com
 Stone Cage 2 on ArmFilm
 Stone Grief on Kargin-hayer
 Stone Cage (Qare Dard) on merojax
 Stone Cage on merkino
 Stone Cage on barevhayer
 Stone Cage at the Internet Movie Database

Armenian comedy television series
Armenian-language television shows
2015 Armenian television series debuts
2010s Armenian television series
ATV (Armenia) original programming